The Best of Guided By Voices: Human Amusements at Hourly Rates is a greatest-hits collection from Dayton, Ohio rock group Guided by Voices.  The collection features selections ranging from the early song "Captain's Dead," from Devil Between My Toes to 2003's "The Best of Jill Hives" from Earthquake Glue.

The title Human Amusements at Hourly Rates comes from the 1999 GBV song "In Stitches" off Do the Collapse.

Track listing

References

2003 greatest hits albums
Guided by Voices compilation albums